The first Danby ministry was the name of the governmental body led by The Earl of Danby during the reign of Charles II. It was the successor of the Cabal ministry which fell from power when the Catholicism of some members became a problem for parliament. As a consequence of this issue, the Danby ministry was traditionally associated with an Anglican policy in the Church of England and a pro-Dutch foreign policy.

Membership
Shown here is a table showing the main membership of the Danby Ministry for its duration.

English ministries
Political history of England
1670s in England
1674 establishments in England
1679 disestablishments in England
Ministries of Charles II of England